Heliocheilus stigmatia is a species of moth of the family Noctuidae. It is found in Lesotho, the Eastern Cape, KwaZulu-Natal, Transvaal, Zimbabwe, Botswana and Namibia.

External links
 
 

Heliocheilus
Fauna of Lesotho
Moths of Africa